Ariana Moorer (born February 9, 1991) is an American basketball player. In 2017, she won the Icelandic championship and the Icelandic Cup while being named the Úrvalsdeild Foreign Player of the Year, Úrvalsdeild Playoffs MVP and the Icelandic Cup Finals MVP.

Playing career
After graduating from the University of Virginia, Moorer started her professional career with AZS Gorzów.

In November 2016, Moorer signed with Úrvalsdeild kvenna club Keflavík, replacing fellow American Dominique Hudson. She had a successful season, winning the Icelandic championship and the Icelandic Cup while being named the Úrvalsdeild Foreign Player of the Year, Úrvalsdeild Playoffs MVP and the Icelandic Cup Finals MVP.

In 2019, Moorer played for the Gold Coast Rollers. For the season she averaged 18.1 points, 8.9 rebounds and 5.4 assists, helping the Rollers to the QBL finals.

In January 2020, Moorer signed with Botaş SK. She left the team in March 2020 due to the coronavirus pandemic in Turkey.

In September 2020, Moorer returned to Iceland and signed with Fjölnir, replacing injured Ariel Hearn. She left the team in January 2021 following Hearn's return from injury.

Virginia statistics

Source

References

External links
Icelandic statistics at Icelandic Basketball Association
Profile at Eurobasket.com
Polish League statistics

1991 births
Living people
American expatriate basketball people in Iceland
American women's basketball players
Fjölnir women's basketball players
Keflavík women's basketball players
Úrvalsdeild kvenna basketball players
Point guards
21st-century American women